Mortgageport is the trading name of Mortgageport Management Pty Limited, an Australian company established in 1998. Mortgageport is an Australian Non Bank Lender, mortgage manager, mortgage originator and broker. As at May 2019 it manages a mortgage portfolio in excess of $1.2bn.

Mortgageport is located in Milsons Point, New South Wales, where it has been located since 1999. Established by Glen Spratt and Michael McKelvie, a 50% stake in the company was purchased in 2004 by the Over Fifties Group. In 2011 Spratt and McKelvie bought this 50% stake back.

In 2016 the company entered the Non Bank lending market, where they offer residential mortgage loans as the lender through its 100% owned subsidiary Mortgageport Home Loans Pty Limited.

Mortgageport also owns a 50% stake in MyChoice Home Loans Pty Ltd, a mortgage broker that specialises in residential construction loans.

Mortgageport has a joint venture business with the largest mortgage broker in the United Kingdom, Mortgage Advice Bureau. This business was  formed originally to service the Australian customers of the U.K based real estate business Purple Bricks, but has since expanded to service other partner businesses.

Mortgageport acts as the servicer and originator for Brighten Home Loans, which is a lender that specialises in providing mortgage loans to Non Residents of Australia purchasing residential property in Australia.

Mortgage